USS Limpkin (AMS/MSC-195) was a  acquired by the United States Navy for clearing coastal minefields.

Construction
The second ship to be named Limpkin by the Navy was laid down 17 April 1953, as AMS-195, by Broward Marine, Inc., Fort Lauderdale, Florida; launched 22 May 1954; sponsored by Mrs. Edward Applegate; reclassified MSC-195 on 7 February 1955; and commissioned 10 April 1955.

East Coast operations 
After reporting to Mine Division 45 at Charleston, South Carolina, 15 April 1955, the new coastal minesweeper proceeded to Narragansett Bay, Rhode Island, for shakedown. Returning to Charleston on 19 June, Limpkin trained with the Fleet Sonar School, Key West, Florida, 20 July to 3 August, then returned home for operations off South Carolina and a post shake down overhaul.

Transferred to MinDiv 41 
Transferred to Mine Division 41 on New Year's Day, during 1956, Limpkin worked with the Mine Evaluation Depot, Key West; spent a month undergoing refresher training at Guantanamo Bay, Cuba; and participated in a minesweeping exercise with the Atlantic Fleet.

Shifting home port to Yorktown, Virginia, site of the Navy Mine Warfare School, in January 1957, for the next two years the ship trained Navy men in the dangers and intricacies of minesweeping operations.

Participating in NATO exercises 
Changing her home port to Little Creek, Virginia, 1 January 1959, Limpkin operated with the amphibious forces of the Atlantic Fleet and tested experimental minesweeping gear in the Chesapeake Bay. The ship departed Little Creek on 29 September 1960, for the NATO exercise "Sweepclear" off Nova Scotia. Calling briefly at Boston, Massachusetts, Limpkin arrived at Halifax on 6 October, and operated with Canadian minesweepers until 19 October.

Returning to Little Creek 26 October, the ship soon deployed to the Caribbean, visiting Cristobal, Panama, and San Juan, Puerto Rico, during the three-month cruise and participating in LANTPHIBEX 1-61. For the remainder of 1961, she patrolled Chesapeake Bay, evaluating new equipment and training recruits.

Canadian operations 
Following another LANTPHIBEX in the Caribbean during early 1962, Limpkin returned to Nova Scotia in October 1962, for a Joint operation "Sweepclear" with Canadian Mine Squadron 1. In 1963, plus operating in the Chesapeake Bay, the ship gained more invaluable training with the Canadians, as "Sweepclear" shifted to Mayport, Florida, thus providing familiarity with the breadth and unity of American-Canadian defense for the eastern coast of North America.

Limpkin continued this pattern of service, perfecting the dangerous art of mine warfare in operations along the Atlantic coast and in the Caribbean until late 1968.

Inactivation and use as a training ship 
She continued to give reservists first hand training into 1969.

Transfer to Indonesia and decommissioning
Limpkin was transferred to Indonesia in 1971, and renamed Pulau Anjer (M-719). She was struck from the Naval Register, 1 May 1976; and disposed of for scrap through the Defense Reutilization and Marketing Service on 1 September 1976.

Citations

Bibliography

External links 
 

 

Bluebird-class minesweepers
Ships built in Fort Lauderdale, Florida
1954 ships
Cold War minesweepers of the United States
Pulau Anjer
Ships transferred from the United States Navy to the Indonesian Navy
Adjutant-class minesweepers